Edward Casey (8 July 1917 – 10 May 1991) was an Irish Gaelic footballer who played as a forward for club sides Macroom and Clonakilty, at inter-county level with the Cork senior football team and at inter-provincial level with Munster.

Playing career

Casey began his career by captaining the Macroom minor team to the County Championship title in 1935. He quickly joined the club's senior side, however, he transferred for a short while to Clonakilty and won back-to-back County Championship titles in 1943 and 1944. By this stage, Casey was a regular with the Cork senior football team, having made his debut at centre-back in 1940. He won his first Munster Championship title in 1943. Casey claimed a second provincial winners' medal in 1945 before ending the season with an All-Ireland medal after a defeat of Cavan in the final. He added a Railway Cup medal to his collection in 1946. Casey's inter-county career ended in 1947, however, he continued to line out at club level with the Macroom junior team until the 1950s.

Death

Casey died at his home in Macroom on 10 May 1991.

Honours

Macroom
Cork Minor Football Championship: 1935 (c)

Clonakilty
Cork Senior Football Championship: 1943, 1944

Cork
All-Ireland Senior Football Championship: 1945
Munster Senior Football Championship: 1943, 1945

Munster
Railway Cup: 1946

References

1917 births
1991 deaths
Macroom Gaelic footballers
Clonakilty Gaelic footballers
Cork inter-county Gaelic footballers
Munster inter-provincial Gaelic footballers
Gaelic football selectors
People from Macroom